Reginald Lane Poole, FBA (1857–1939) was a British historian. He was Keeper of the Archives and a lecturer in diplomatics at the University of Oxford, where he gave the Ford Lectures in 1912 on the subject of "The Exchequer in the Twelfth Century". Son of Edward Stanley Poole, the "Lane" in his surname comes from his paternal grandmother Sophia Lane Poole, author of An Englishwoman in Egypt (1844). He was the father of Austin Lane Poole (1889–1963), also a historian and Ford's Lecturer; the brother of the orientalist Stanley Lane-Poole; the nephew of Reginald Stuart Poole; and the great-nephew of Edward William Lane.

He edited, among other works, with W. Hunt, Political History of England (twelve volumes, 1905–10).

His works include:
History of the Huguenots of the Dispersion (1880)
Sebastian Bach (1882)
Illustrations of the History of Medieval Thought (1884)
Wycliffe and Movements for Reform (1889)
Historical Atlas of Modern Europe (1897–1902)
Lectures on the History of the Papal Chancery (1915)
Medieval Reckonings of Time (1918)
Studies in Chronology and History (1934)

References 

Open-Site.org

External links 
 
 
 
 

1857 births
1939 deaths
British historians
English archivists
Keepers of the Archives of the University of Oxford
Fellows of the British Academy
Corresponding Fellows of the Medieval Academy of America